The tokay gecko (Gekko gecko) is a nocturnal arboreal gecko in the genus Gekko, the true geckos. It is native to Asia and some Pacific Islands.

Etymology 
The word tokay comes from hearing the sound made by males of this species. The common and scientific names, as well as the family name Gekkonidae and the generic term gecko come from this species too, from ge'kok in Javanese from tokek in Malay.

Subspecies 
Two subspecies are currently recognized.
G. g. gecko (Linnaeus, 1758): tropical Asia from northeastern India to eastern Indonesia.
G. g. azhari (Mertens, 1955): found only in Bangladesh.

Distribution and habitat 
This species is found in northeast India, Bhutan, Nepal, and Bangladesh; throughout Southeast Asia, including Thailand, the Philippines, Malaysia and Indonesia; and toward western New Guinea. Its native habitat is rainforest, where it lives on trees and cliffs, and it frequently adapts to rural human habitations, roaming walls and ceilings at night in search of insect prey. This is an introduced species in some areas outside its native range. It is established in Florida in the United States, Martinique, the islands of Belize, and possibly Hawaii. Increasing urbanization is reducing its range.

It is currently unclear whether the species is native but very uncommon in Taiwan or whether the rare reports of individuals since the 1920s are based on repeated anthropogenic translocations that may or may not have resulted in established populations by now.

Physical characteristics 

It is believed to be the third largest species of gecko, after the giant leaf-tail gecko (Uroplatus giganteus) and New Caledonian giant gecko (Rhacodactylus leachianus). It is cylindrical but somewhat flattened in body shape. The eyes have vertical pupils.

The skin is soft to the touch and is generally blue-gray with red or orange spots and speckles, but the animal can change the color of its skin to blend into the environment. The species is sexually dimorphic, the males being more brightly colored and slightly larger.

It is a strong climber with foot pads that can support the entire weight of the body on a vertical surface for a long period of time. Compared to other gecko species, the tokay gecko has a robust build, with a  tail, a large head and muscular jaws.

Behaviour 
Tokay geckos are generally aggressive, territorial, and can inflict a strong bite. Though common in the pet trade, the strong bite of the tokay gecko makes it ill-suited for inexperienced keepers. In addition, the strength of the bite depends on the gecko's size; larger (usually male) tokay geckos are capable of piercing skin, which often results in immediate bleeding.

Females lay clutches of one or two hard-shelled eggs and guard them until they hatch.

Diet 
The tokay gecko feeds on insects and small vertebrates. In a study conducted in Thailand, researchers noticed that there was little variation in the diets of males, females, and juveniles, which was likely due to low insect availability in this area.

Call 

The male's mating call, a loud croak, is variously described as sounding like token, gekk-gekk, tuck-too, túc-key, tou-kay or tokay. Most of the time, the call is often preceded by a quick "cackling", similar to the chirping sounds made by house geckos albeit much lower in pitch. When threatened or alarmed, tokay geckos usually "bark" while opening their mouth in a defensive posture.

The tokay gecko's call is also responsible for the name given to it by Filipino residents: "Tuko," and by U.S. soldiers during the Vietnam War, the "Fuck-you lizard".

Light and temperature can affect its vocalizations. The most frequent calling occurs in May at dusk, and the second peak of call frequency occurs in May at dawn. Vocalizations and associated behavior were strongly affected by ambient temperature in both the lab and field and could thus play a role in regulating animal energetic metabolism

Conservation and relationship with humans

The tokay gecko is culturally significant in many East Asian countries. Regional folklore has attributed supernatural powers to the gecko. In Southeast Asia it is a symbol of good luck and fertility. It is believed to be descended from dragons.

This species is poached for the medicinal trades in parts of Asia. The tokay gecko is an ingredient in traditional Chinese medicine, known as Ge Jie (蛤蚧). It is believed to nourish the kidneys and lungs, beliefs that are not substantiated by medical science. The animal remains highly sought after in China, Hong Kong, Taiwan, Vietnam, Malaysia, Singapore and other parts of Asia with Chinese communities, to the point where unscrupulous merchants have taken to disfiguring monitor lizards with prosthetics to pass them off as colossal tokay gecko specimens.

From 2009 to 2011, the poaching of tokay geckos intensified because of a short-lived belief that they were an effective HIV cure.

The tokay gecko is quickly becoming a threatened species in the Philippines because of indiscriminate hunting. Collecting, transporting and trading in geckos without a license can be punishable by up to 12 years in jail and a fine of up to ₱1 million under Republic Act 9147, in addition to other applicable international laws. However, the trade runs unchecked because of the sheer number of illegal traders and reports of lucrative deals. Chinese buyers and other foreign nationals are rumored to pay thousands of dollars for large specimens, because of their alleged medicinal value or as commodities in the illegal wildlife trade.

The species is protected under Appendix II of the  Convention on International Trade in Endangered Species (CITES) meaning international trade (including in parts and derivatives) is subject to the CITES permitting system.

Captivity 
Tokay geckos are becoming more popular as pets because of their striking colors and large size. Most of them are wild-caught imports, but captive-bred ones are becoming more common. Wild-caught adults can be difficult to keep because of their aggressive nature and powerful bite, but captive-bred juveniles can be less aggressive if handled from a young age. 

When well cared for, tokay geckos can live up to 15–20 years.

References

External links 

Tokay Gecko – Reptile Parkreptilepark.com.au.
Tokay Gecko – EcologyAsia.
Tokay Gecko Care. TokayGecko.org
The sound of a Balinese geko in Sanur. Recorded October 2004. SoundCloud.
Nonnatives – Tokay Gecko. Florida Fish and Wildlife Conservation Commission.
 Australian Reptile Park.

Geckos
Gekko
Reptiles of Southeast Asia
Reptiles of Bangladesh
Reptiles of China
Reptiles of Taiwan
Reptiles described in 1758
Taxa named by Carl Linnaeus
Geckos of Thailand